Atrioventricular opening may refer to: 
 Right atrioventricular orifice
 Left atrioventricular orifice